The discography of Japanese reggae band Shōnan no Kaze consists of four studio albums, two compilation albums, two live DVDs, and 11 singles.

Studio albums

Compilation albums

Singles

*Japan Hot 100 established February 2008, RIAJ Digital Track Chart established April 2009.
†still charting.

DVDs

References 

Pop music discographies
Discographies of Japanese artists